Members of the New South Wales Legislative Council between 1967 and 1970 were indirectly elected by a joint sitting of the New South Wales Parliament, with 15 members elected every three years. The most recent election was on 8 December 1966, with the term of new members commencing on 23 April 1967. The President was Sir Harry Budd.

References

See also
First Askin ministry
Second Askin ministry
Third Askin ministry

Members of New South Wales parliaments by term
20th-century Australian politicians